The Bob Graham Center for Public Service, housed at the University of Florida in Gainesville, is a community of students, scholars and citizens. The center was founded by the former Florida Governor and U.S. Senator Bob Graham.

The center, located in Pugh Hall on the University of Florida campus, held its grand opening in March 2008.

Public Programs
The Center regularly hosts public events. These events are open to the public and most feature audience question-and-answer sessions.

The Bob Graham Center Civic Library

The Florida Joint Center for Citizenship

The Florida Joint Center for Citizenship is a partnership between the Lou Frey Institute of Politics and Government at the University of Central Florida and the Bob Graham Center. Established in 2007 by formal agreement between the University of Florida and the University of Central Florida.

See also
 Bob Graham
 College of Liberal Arts and Sciences
 University of Florida
 Civil Debate Wall

References

External links
 Alligator article on the Bob Graham Center
Gainesville Sun info about the College

University of Florida
Public administration schools in the United States
Public policy schools
Educational institutions established in 2006
2006 establishments in Florida